Ethmia suspecta is a moth in the family Depressariidae. It was described by Sattler in 1967. It is found in Asia Minor (Malatya) and Syria.

References

Moths described in 1967
suspecta